Mohammad Jafar Abadei Mosque is a historical mosque in Isfahan, Iran. It was built in 1878 by the famous clergyman of the Qajar era, Mohammad Jafar Abadei. The mosque is famous because of its tiles and its architecture.

See also 

 Islam in Iran

Sources 

Mosque buildings with domes
Mosques completed in 1878
19th-century mosques
Mosques in Isfahan
National works of Iran
Buildings of the Qajar period